Daniel John Snyder Jr. (May 2, 1916 – May 11, 1980) was a United States district judge of the United States District Court for the Western District of Pennsylvania.

Education and career

Born in Greensburg, Pennsylvania, Snyder received an Artium Baccalaureus degree from College of Wooster in 1937 and a Bachelor of Laws from the University of Pittsburgh School of Law in 1940. He was an associate professor at the University of Pittsburgh from 1940 to 1941. He enlisted in the United States Army October 27, 1942, and served as a Warrant Officer until December 1945. He was in private practice in Greensburg from 1946 to 1958. He was an Assistant United States Attorney of the Western District of Pennsylvania from 1958 to 1961. He was in private practice in Greensburg from 1961 to 1973.

Federal judicial service

Snyder was nominated by President Richard Nixon on March 6, 1973, to a seat on the United States District Court for the Western District of Pennsylvania vacated by Judge Joseph F. Weis Jr. He was confirmed by the United States Senate on April 10, 1973, and received his commission on April 17, 1973. Snyder served in that capacity until his death on May 11, 1980.

References

Sources
 

1916 births
1980 deaths
Judges of the United States District Court for the Western District of Pennsylvania
United States district court judges appointed by Richard Nixon
20th-century American judges
20th-century American lawyers
Assistant United States Attorneys
College of Wooster alumni
University of Pittsburgh School of Law alumni
People from Greensburg, Pennsylvania